Murder in Polná is a 2016 Czech film that deals with Hilsner Affair. Hilsner's lawyer Zdeno Auředníček is the protagonist of the film.

Plot
The film starts with murder of Anežka Hrůzová. She was found between the village of Veznicka and the town of Polná. People conclude that Jews must have been involved with the murder as there was no sexual violence and everyone believes that murder had religious motif. Young Jewish rover Leopold Hillsner comes up as potential murderer.

Cast
Jaroslav Plesl as Zdeno Auředníček
Karel Heřmánek jr. as Leopold Hilsner
Karel Roden as Tomáš Garrigue Masaryk
Gabriela Míčová as Anna Auředníčková
František Němec as Reichl

References

External links
 
 Official website

2016 television films
2010s Czech-language films
Czech historical films
Czech crime films
Czech Lion Awards winners (films)
Czech television films
Czech Television original films
Czech legal films
2016 films
Films released in separate parts